Patrik Gedeon (born 19 July 1975) is a Czech footballer who plays for FC Chomutov, on loan from FK Dukla Prague. He has played international football for the Czech Republic.

Club career
Gedeon played for six years at Chmel Blšany, where he was captain.

In 2001, Gedeon moved to Slavia Prague, signing a three-year contract for a transfer fee of 12 million Czech koruna. He served as Slavia's captain during his time at the club.

Gedeon sustained a knee injury after playing just five games in the 2003/04 season, and although he attempted to make a comeback in a game against Slovácko, he lasted just 17 minutes and did not feature for Slavia's first team for the rest of the season.

In September 2005, Gedeon suffered a knee injury in a game against Viktoria Plzeň. Gedeon missed two months of the season with the injury before returning to Slavia's first team in a match against Blšany in November, where he wore the captain's armband.

In January 2006, Gedeon headed to Liechtenstein to play for FC Vaduz in the Swiss Challenge League, signing a -year contract. However, in July of the same year Gedeon left Vaduz and joined Czech manager Josef Csaplár at Polish side Wisła Płock.

In the summer of 2007, Gedeon signed an amateur contract with Chmel Blšany, where he played the first half of the 2007/08 season. In January 2008 he began training with FK SIAD Most.

In July 2008 Gedeon signed for FK Dukla Prague in the Czech 2. Liga. After missing the autumn part of the 2010–11 Czech 2. Liga with injury, Gedeon marked his return to action in March 2011, scoring in a 5–0 win against Čáslav. In November 2012, Gedeon extended his contract with Dukla until the summer of 2015. He signed another contract extension in February 2015, this time until June 2016. In August 2015 he moved on loan to Most, the club which he had left seven years prior. Gedeon joined FC Chomutov on loan as an amateur player in the spring of 2016.

International career
On 20 November 2002, Gedeon made his debut for the Czech Republic in a friendly match against Sweden, which finished 3–3. He subsequently played in February 2003 against France and played the whole 90 minutes of the match against Turkey in April 2003.

Despite being called up to the national squad by manager Karel Brückner for the September 2004 match against the Netherlands, Gedeon did not represent his country after 2003.

References

External links
 
 
 
 

1975 births
Living people
Sportspeople from Chomutov
Czech footballers
Czech Republic international footballers
Czech First League players
FK Chmel Blšany players
SK Slavia Prague players
FK Baník Most players
FK Dukla Prague players
Expatriate footballers in Liechtenstein
FC Vaduz players
Expatriate footballers in Poland
Ekstraklasa players
Wisła Płock players
Czech expatriate sportspeople in Poland
Association football midfielders
Czech expatriate sportspeople in Liechtenstein
Swiss Challenge League players